Zukić is a surname. Notable people with the surname include:

 Amir Zukić (born 1966), Bosnian politician
 Amir Zukić (TV host) (born 1972), Bosnian television host and media manager
 Dejan Zukić (born 2001), Serbian footballer
 Muhidin Zukić (born 1971), retired Bosnian-Herzegovinian footballer
 Seid Zukić (born 1994), Bosnian footballer
 Zoran Zukić (born 1981), Serbian footballer

Bosnian surnames